KETD (channel 53) is a television station licensed to Castle Rock, Colorado, United States, broadcasting the Spanish-language Estrella TV network to the Denver area. Owned and operated by Estrella Media, the station maintains offices on East Jamison Circle in Englewood, and its transmitter is located on Mount Morrison in western Jefferson County.

History
The station first signed on the air on July 1, 1990 as KWHD. Founded by LeSEA Broadcasting (now Family Broadcasting Corporation), the station carried a mix of Christian-targeted programs, family-oriented syndicated programs and movies. Christian programming aired for much of the broadcast day, with breakaway windows for secular programming (including sitcoms, westerns and public domain movies) each weekday from 2 to 7 p.m. and a scattered amount for a few hours a day on Saturdays, which included a morning children's program block, and a schedule consisting entirely of Christian-oriented religious programs on Sundays. By 2008, KWHD claimed to be "the only full-time, commercial, independent TV station in Colorado." Its schedule by this point was split between family-oriented secular programming and local sports programming 40% of the time and Christian religious programs for the remaining 60% of the broadcast day outside of Sundays.

On January 28, 2010, LeSEA announced that it would sell KWHD to Liberman Broadcasting (which was renamed Estrella Media in February 2020, following a corporate reorganization of the company under private equity firm HPS Investment Partners, LLC). On June 1, 2010, the station became an owned-and-operated station of the Liberman-owned Estrella TV and changed its call letters to KETD. As part of the deal, KETD agreed to lease its second digital subchannel to LeSEA to continue carrying its programming (which was also carried on the station's former semi-translator KWHS-LD in Colorado Springs, which LeSEA owned until 2018).

Technical information

Subchannel

Analog-to-digital conversion
KETD shut down its analog signal, over UHF channel 53, on January 16, 2009. The station's digital signal remained on its pre-transition UHF channel 46. Through the use of PSIP, digital television receivers display the station's virtual channel as its former UHF analog channel 53, which was among the high band UHF channels (52-69) that were removed from broadcasting use as a result of the transition.

References

External links

Estrella TV affiliates
Television channels and stations established in 1990
1990 establishments in Colorado
ETD
ETD
Estrella Media stations
Castle Rock, Colorado